Latvia competed at the 2016 Summer Paralympics in Rio de Janeiro, Brazil, from 7 to 18 September 2016. They won four medals; two gold and two bronze. It was their most successful paralympic games to date.

Disability classifications

Every participant at the Paralympics has their disability grouped into one of five disability categories; amputation, the condition may be congenital or sustained through injury or illness; cerebral palsy; wheelchair athletes, there is often overlap between this and other categories; visual impairment, including blindness; Les autres, any physical disability that does not fall strictly under one of the other categories, for example dwarfism or multiple sclerosis. Each Paralympic sport then has its own classifications, dependent upon the specific physical demands of competition. Events are given a code, made of numbers and letters, describing the type of event and classification of the athletes competing. Some sports, such as athletics, divide athletes by both the category and severity of their disabilities, other sports, for example swimming, group competitors from different categories together, the only separation being based on the severity of the disability.

Medallists

Archery

Latvia qualified one archer for the Rio Games following their performance at the 2015 World Archery Para Championships. Ieve Melle earned the spot in the women's recurve open after defeating Czech archer Marketa Sidkova in straight sets.

|-
|align=left|Gints Jonasts
|align=left|Men's individual recurve open
|541
|32
|L 2–6
|colspan=4|did not advance
|17
|-
|align=left|Ieva Melle
|align=left|Women's individual recurve open
|592
|12
|W 6–5
|W 6–4
|L 0–6
|colspan=2|did not advance
|8
|-
|align=left|Gints JonastsIeva Melle
|align=left|Mixed team recurve open
|1133
|13
|
|L 0–6
|colspan=3|did not advance
|9
|}

Athletics

Equestrian 
The country earned an individual slot via the Para Equestrian Individual Ranking List Allocation method.

Rowing

Eduards Pupels
Qualification Legend: FA=Final A (medal); FB=Final B (non-medal); R=Repechage

Swimming

Men

Wheelchair fencing 

Women

In popular culture 
On 15 November 2016 Latvijas Pasts issued three different postage stamps to commemorate the three Latvian medal winners of the 2016 Paralympics, which makes it the first time in Latvian history that paralympics are commemorated with a postage stamp issue.

See also
Latvia at the 2016 Summer Olympics

References

Nations at the 2016 Summer Paralympics
2016
2016 in Latvian sport